The traditional Chinese calendar divides a year into 24 solar terms. Mángzhòng, Bōshu, Mangjong, or Mang chủng (neologized term, unknown in vietnam, just popularized recently) is the ninth solar term. It begins when the Sun reaches the celestial longitude of 75° and ends when it reaches the longitude of 90°. It more often refers in particular to the day when the Sun is exactly at the celestial longitude of 75°. In the Gregorian calendar, it usually begins around June 5 (June 6 East Asia time) and ends around June 21.

Introduction of Grain in Ear (芒种)
"grain in ear" means the grains are mature. It happens around June 5 every year when the Sun reaches the celestial longitude of 75 degrees. During this period, crops like barley and wheat all get mature and are waiting to be harvested. In Chinese, "Grain in Ear" is called Mang Zhong. Mang means grains at the same time busy. It forecasts the farmer is getting back to the busy field work.

It is the busiest time to seed millet and the deadline for sowing activities. During this period, areas around the middle stream and downstream of the Yangtze River enter the rainy season. Sensing the wetness, the mantis comes out, the shrike starts to sing and the mockingbird stops tweet.

The arrival of Grain in Ear signifies the ripening of awny crops such as wheat and it is also a busy period for farmers. That can be seen from many farm sayings. One of the sayings is, "Getting busy with farm work in Grain in Ear," prevailing in many provinces. Grain in Ear is especially critical for planting rice. There is a saying in Guizhou that goes, "If you don't plant rice in Grain in Ear, planting will be in vain."

Date and time

Traditional customs
As the flowers withered away, people in old times used to hold the ceremony to sacrifice for the "God of Flowers", showing their gratitude and their eagerness to see the flowers again next year. This custom is already long gone and people can only read the scene in some of the ancient novels. In China's south Anhui province, people steam dumplings with new fresh wheat flour after seeding the paddy rice. They make the flour into different shapes such as cereals, animals, vegetables, and fruits, color them and pray for villagers' safety.

Healthy living tips
The best food to eat during "Grain in Ear" period, as suggested by Chinese doctors, is mulberry. Around two thousand years ago, mulberry had already been considered as royal food and among the folk, it was called the "holy fruit". It has abundant glucose, cane sugar, Vitamin A, B and C and many mineral substances and is very good for humans' heart, liver, and kidney.

References

09
Summer